The Eastern Bosphorus (Russian: Босфор Восточный, Bosfor Vostochny) is a strait located in Primorsky Krai, Russia, that separates the Muravyov-Amursky Peninsula and Russky Island, and connects Amur Bay and Ussuri Bay within Peter the Great Gulf.

The strait features several bays within the peninsula and Russky Island, including the major Zolotoy Rog bay. Around this bay, most of the city of Vladivostok is located.

See also
 
 Bosphorus
 Cimmerian Bosporus

Straits of the Pacific Ocean
Straits of Russia
Bodies of water of the Sea of Japan
Bodies of water of Primorsky Krai
Pacific Coast of Russia